Justice M. Chambers (1908–1982) was a World War II United States Marine Corps officer and Medal of Honor recipient. 

Justice Chambers may also refer to:

Ezekiel F. Chambers (1788–1867), judge of the Maryland Court of Appeals
George Chambers (Pennsylvania politician) (1786–1866), associate justice of the Pennsylvania Supreme Court
Robert Chambers (English judge) (1737–1803), chief justice of the Supreme Court of Judicature at Fort William, Bengal
Tom Chambers (judge) (1943–2013), associate justice of the Washington Supreme Court
William Lea Chambers (1852–1933), United States-appointed chief justice of Samoa

See also
Judge Chambers (disambiguation)